Vrhov Dol is a settlement in the foothills of the Pohorje range southwest of Maribor in northeastern Slovenia. It belongs to the City Municipality of Maribor.

References

External links
Vrhov Dol on Geopedia

Populated places in the City Municipality of Maribor